The Honour of Lancaster was a medieval English honour (a large estate) located primarily in the north-west of England, between 1066 and the 15th century.

Details

The Honour of Lancaster was established after the Norman conquest of England after a wide band of territory, including the lands between the River Ribble and the River Mersey, was granted by William the Conqueror to Roger the Poitevin, a powerful Norman lord. The Domesday Book does not say that Roger owned Lancaster, which is listed as part of the manor of Halton. One entry does imply he had a castle somewhere which has been argued to be either Clitheroe or Penwortham. It is thought that he began building Lancaster Castle afterwards. The lands in the north-west of England formed a largely autonomous palatinate, but was linked to other land holdings stretching down as far as Suffolk, collectively known as the Honour of Lancaster. Roger sided with Robert of Bellême against Henry I and was subsequently exiled, but the Honour remained intact as a distinct collection of estates.

Henry I gave the Honour to one of his nephews, Stephen of Blois, who later became king after Henry's death. Control of the northern parts of the Honour was disputed during the civil war known as the Anarchy. Henry II took the Honour, before it passed to Stephen's son, William, in the late 1150s. William's widow held the Honour for a period, before it passed back to the Crown in 1164. In 1189 Richard I granted the Honour to Prince John, when the estates were listed as providing a revenue of £200 a year.

By the end of the 12th century, a County of Lancaster was increasingly being referred to in the Pipe rolls. It later became common to describe parts of the honour as within or without the Lyme, to substitute the county border.

Since 1194 the honour had been held by the crown, but in 1267 it was given to Edmund Crouchback (father of the House of Lancaster), the son of King Henry III, when he was created the 1st Earl of Lancaster, subsequently becoming part of the Duchy of Lancaster.

References

Bibliography

Further reading

Cronne, H. A. (1935) "The Honour of Lancaster in Stephen's Reign," The English Historical Review, Vol. 50, No. 200, pp. 670–680.

Lancaster
History of Lancashire
History of Suffolk